Chakarov or Chakarova (feminine) is a Bulgarian last name and may refer to:
Dzhevdet Chakarov, Bulgarian Minister of Environment and Water from 2005 to 2009; see Stanishev Government
Georgi Chakarov, a Bulgarian footballer
Ivan Chakarov, a Bulgarian world class weightlifter
Zhorzheta Chakarova, a Bulgarian actress; see List of Bulgarian actors

Bulgarian-language surnames